Science Signaling is a peer-reviewed scientific journal that is focused on cell signaling and regulation. It is published weekly by the American Association for the Advancement of Science (AAAS). The editor-in-chief (Chief Scientific Editor) is Michael B. Yaffe (Massachusetts Institute of Technology), and the journal is part of the Science Family of Journals of which Holden Thorp is the Editor-in-Chief.

Scope 
The journal covers research on cell signaling and the processes of cellular regulation. In addition, the journal covers signaling networks, synthetic biology, systems biology, drug discovery, and computation and modeling of regulatory pathways. Besides full length articles, it also publishes reviews, perspectives, meeting reports, presentations (for a wider audience), protocols, book reviews, teaching resources, a glossary, and a Journal Club section.

History 
The journal was established in 1999 as Science's STKE. On January 8, 2008, it obtained its current name and volume numbering restarted at 1. As Science's STKE, the journal's last issue was volume 2007, issue 417, on December 18, 2007.

Abstracting and indexing 
Science Signaling is abstracted and indexed by:

According to the Journal Citation Reports, the journal has a 2016 impact factor of 6.494.

References

External links 
 

Molecular and cellular biology journals
Publications established in 1999
Weekly journals
English-language journals
American Association for the Advancement of Science academic journals